The Virginia State Police, officially the Virginia Department of State Police, conceived in 1919 and established in 1932, is the state police force for the U.S. state of Virginia.  The agency originated out of the Virginia Department of Motor Vehicles as an inspector and enforcer of highway laws. It is currently one of fourteen agencies within the Cabinet Secretariat of Public Safety, under the leadership of Secretary Brian Moran until his resignation in January, 2022.  On January 18, 2018, Gary T. Settle was sworn in as Superintendent of the Virginia State Police.  Colonel Settle replaced retiring Colonel W. Steven Flaherty, who had served since 2003.

History
In 1919 the Virginia State Police was conceived with the passing of the Automobile acts which stated that the Commissioner of Motor Vehicles and his assistants were vested with the powers of a Sheriff for the purpose of enforcing the provisions of the law. The Secretary of the Commonwealth continued to be responsible for this regulation. The burden of enforcement remained with Sheriffs and Constables in counties and police officers in the cities and towns.

In 1919 the Motor Vehicle Act was passed, creating the first title laws for Virginia motor vehicle owners.

In 1932 inspectors became empowered to enforce criminal codes, as well as motor vehicle codes. In doing so legislators created a state enforcement group with the power to arrest anywhere in Virginia. A mobile enforcement agency was now ready for duty wherever civil strife or emergency conditions might exist that would warrant police personnel to ensure peace and security. It was at this time that inspectors began to be known as "Troopers."

On November 3, 1938, an executive order from Majors Bishop and Nicholas officially adopted the title of "State Trooper." The purpose of this was to identify specific members of the Division of Motor Vehicles performing the role of inspector and motorcycle deputy.

On March 14, 1942, the General Assembly abolished the existing Division of Motor Vehicles and created two separate agencies: The Division of Motor Vehicles and the Department of State Police. The act called for a position of superintendent for the State Police and a commissioner for the Division of Motor Vehicles. Major C. W. Woodson Jr. was officially appointed as superintendent for the State Police.

Trooper Training
Training for Troopers is divided into 2 phases;

Phase 1: Academy Training (approximately 29 weeks, with 1,536 hours of instruction covering more than 100 courses)

Phase 2: Field Training (approximately 6 to 8 weeks)

Organizational structure
The Department of State Police consists of the Superintendent's Office and three bureaus; Administrative and Support Services, Criminal Investigations and Field Operations.

The Superintendent's Office oversees;

- Public Relations Office (PRO)

- Office of Professional Management and Internal Controls (OPMIC)

- Office of Internal Affairs (OIA)

- Executive Protective Unit (EPU)

The three bureaus are:

Bureau of Criminal Investigation (BCI)

- Criminal Intelligence Division

- Field Offices (Divisions numbered 1 through 7)

 1 - Richmond
 2 - Culpeper
 3 - Appomattox
 4 - Wytheville
 5 - Chesapeake
 6 - Salem
 7 - Fairfax

- High Tech Crimes Division

- Support Services Division

Bureau of Field Operations (BFO)

- Aviation Division (comprising three aviation bases, Richmond, Abingdon and Lynchburg)

- Field Offices (Divisions numbered 1 through 7)
 1 - Richmond
 2 - Culpeper
 3 - Appomattox
 4 - Wytheville
 5 - Chesapeake
 6 - Salem
 7 - Fairfax

(BFO Divisions are further organized into "Area offices", numbered 1 through 49)

- Safety Division (comprising the Virginia Motor Vehicle Safety Inspection Program and the Motor Carrier Safety Unit (MCSU))

- Special Operations Division

Bureau of Administrative and Support Services (BASS)

- Communications Division

- Criminal Justice Information Services

- Human Resources Division

- Information Technology Division

- Property and Finance Division

- Training Division

Department of State Police (commanded by the Colonel)
Bureaus (commanded by a Lieutenant Colonel)
Divisions (commanded by a Captain)
Areas (commanded by a First Sergeant)

Uniform and equipment

The standard Trooper uniform consists of a light gray colored button-up shirt, with long sleeves in winter and short sleeves in summer. A black tie is worn with the long-sleeve shirt. Patches are sewn to each sleeve. Gray pants with a Dark Blue stripe down the sides are worn year round. Black Clarino shoes and Sam Browne belt, without cross strap, gun belt are worn with the uniform.

A black semi-gloss straw Campaign hat is worn year round. A modified winter fur cap can be worn in the colder months.

A dark blue dress blouse and standard black Clarino Sam Browne gun belt, without the cross strap, are worn for special occasions. Dark blue work jackets are utilized for colder months. Black Commando Sweaters, or "wooly pullys" with proper patches and rank can also be worn by Troopers in cold weather.

Sergeants and First Sergeants wear silver, out lined in blue, chevrons showing their rank on both sleeves.  Lieutenants and above wear their rank insignia on the shirt collar.

First Sergeants and below wear silver, out lined in blue, hash marks on the left sleeve denoting years of service.  Each hash mark represents five years of service.

 Issued Weapons

Beginning in late 2018, Troopers of all ranks and Special Agents are issued the SIG Sauer P320 .357 SIG pistol, while Troopers ranked First Sergeant and below are also issued the Benelli Supernova 12-gauge, pump-action shotgun and the Colt M4 Carbine patrol rifle.  Less-than-lethal weapons carried by troopers include OC spray and the ASP baton.

 Previous Issued Weapons

 Remington Model 870 12-gauge Police Magnum shotgun issued till 2019
 SIG Sauer P229R .357 SIG DAK pistol issued from 2004-2018
 SIG Sauer P229 DA/SA .357 SIG issued from 1997 to 2004
 SIG Sauer P228 DA/SA 9mm issued from 1993 to 1997.
 Smith & Wesson Model 1026 10mm DA/SA 5-inch barrel stainless semi-auto pistol issued from 1990 to 1993.
 Smith & Wesson Model 64 .38 caliber 4-inch barrel stainless steel revolver issued in the mid 1970s to 1990.
 Colt Officer's Model .38 caliber 4-inch barrel revolver was used from 1967 until the mid-1970s.
 Colt Official Police .38 caliber 6-inch barrel revolver was used up until 1967.
 Thompson submachine gun .45 caliber used from the 1930s until 1974.

 Issued Vehicles

The department has used many different makes and models since its inception.

 Patrol Cars

Prior to 1928, inspectors only used automobiles once they had seized a vehicle used to transport illegal whiskey and it had been released to the Division for enforcement purposes by the courts. Fords became the first issued patrol vehicles in 1928. In 1932 white Chevrolet roadsters and white motorcycles were purchased and became known as the "Great White Fleet". Fords and Chevys were the main staple of the patrol force in the 1930s and early 1940s. In 1945 post-war acquisitions of police vehicles were rare and troopers made arrangements to purchase vehicles wherever they could. Buicks and Pontiacs supplemented the fleet until auto manufacturers resumed normal production.

In 1948 the Department adopted the distinctive blue and gray paint scheme for all vehicles. Later in 1952 reflective markings were adopted and used for all marked vehicles. Those same markings are still in use today.

During the 1940s, 50's, 60's, 70's, and 80's the Department purchased Fords, Chevy's, Chryslers, and Plymouths for use as patrol cars. Ford's and Chevy's were used mainly used in the 90's and 2000's. Dodge Chargers were introduced into the fleet in 2006.

Red emergency lights were in use until 1985 and then were replaced with blue emergency lights. Bar lights were phased onto vehicles in 1988 replacing the single "bubble gum" light. "TROOPER" decals were added to the front fenders of patrol cars in 1995. In 1999, the Department adopted Ford's silver, replacing the traditional paint scheme's gray. Only the hood, roof and trunk were painted blue. This was due to budget constraints and that Ford stop using that particular gray paint. "Slicktop" Chevrolet Impalas were put into use beginning in 2001. Seven "slicktop" 2002 Chevrolet 9C1 Camaros were put into service in high traffic areas in 2002.

In 2006 the Department purchased 30+ Hemi V8 Dodge Chargers and for the first time since 1948 adopted new graphics for the marked and slicktop Chargers.

In 2008 the Virginia State Police's Dodge Charger was Law and Order Magazine's Police Vehicle Design Winner for State and Federal Agencies.

In 2013 the Ford Police Interceptor Sedan was added to the fleet of Virginia State 
Police vehicles since the Ford Crown Vic model ceased production.  In 2019, the Virginia State Police bought every available new Police Interceptor sedan, giving the state a steady supply of new Interceptor sedans for up to 5 years beyond the model's discontinuation depending on vehicle attrition due to accidents or other damage.

In 2019, the department added Ford Police Interceptor Utility SUV for specialty units (K-9, TacTeam and Motor Carrier units).

Starting in 2020, the department took delivery of their new patrol vehicles, the 2020 Ford Police Interceptor Utility.  Dressed in all silver and adopting newer styled graphics, first used on the 2006 Dodge Chargers.  Ending a long tradition of their blue and gray paint scheme, in use since 1948 and traditional graphics, in use since 1952.  These new patrol vehicles ended another long tradition; the adoption of red emergency lights in combination with blue and the use of internal light bars instead of roof mounted lights.

As of 2021, the Virginia State Police fleet consists primarily of 2013-2019 Ford Police Interceptor Sedans and 2020 and 2021 Ford Police Interceptor Utilities.  These vehicles are supplemented by 2013-2020 Chevrolet Tahoe PPVs primarily used for specialty units and 2020 Ford F-350 Super Duty XLs as utility vehicles; as well as the remaining Ford Crown Victoria Police Interceptors and unmarked Chevrolet Impala PPVs.

 Aviation Division

-5 Bell 407 Helicopters

-1 Bell 412EPI Helicopter

-2 Airbus EC-145 Helicopters

-3 Cessna 206 Turbo Stationair Airplanes

Rank structure 
Bureau of Field Operations (BFO)Bureau of Criminal Investigation (BCI)
Lieutenant Colonel (Bureau Director)
Major (Bureau Deputy Director)
Captain (Division Commander)
Lieutenant (Special Agent in Charge / Section Commander / Staff Assistant)
First Sergeant (Assistant Special Agent in Charge / Unit Commander / First-line supervisor)
Senior Special Agent, career progression
Special Agent

See also

 List of law enforcement agencies in Virginia
 State police
 State patrol  
 Highway patrol 
 Virginia Capitol Police

References

External links
Official website
Chronological History of the Virginia State Police

Government agencies established in 1932
1932 establishments in Virginia
State law enforcement agencies of Virginia
Police aviation units of the United States